"Killing Is My Business... and Business Is Good!" is a song by the American thrash metal band Megadeth. It is the second track from their debut studio album of the same name, Killing Is My Business... and Business Is Good!, which was released in 1985 by Combat Records.

Background

Music and lyrics 
"Killing Is My Business..." is divided in to two distinct musical sections: a mid-tempo heavy section, and a fast tempoed, thrash section. The song alternates between the two during its three minute runtime. The song is in the key of C#, and has swing styled drums. The vocals are double tracked, with the two tracks having an octave difference in pitch.

The lyrics for the track were inspired by The Punisher comic book. Holy Wars... The Punishment Due would later continue the story of this song. The song tells the story of an assassins who completes a job, and then kills the man who hired him.

Live 
"Killing Is My Business..." has been performed live 83 times by Megadeth, though it hasn't been played since 1994. The song was debuted live on October 24, 1984.

Controversy 
The song caused media controversy when a man by the name of David J. Lefever posted an online request to a radio station to play the tune, saying "Watch the national new (sic) tomorrow I am going to go a shooting spree in Appleton WI," and that the song was "good music to go postal and kill a bunce (sic) of people to". The DJ's who were operating the station immediately contacted the police. Lefever was quickly apprehended and  arrested due to the threat of a shooting spree.

Personnel 
Production and performance credits are adapted from the album liner notes except where noted.

Megadeth
 Dave Mustaine – rhythm guitar, lead vocals
 David Ellefson – bass, backing vocals
 Chris Poland – lead guitar
 Gar Samuelson – drums

Production
 Produced and mixed by Dave Mustaine and Karat Faye
 Co-produced by Megadeth
 Pre-production by Jay Jones

2002 remix and remaster
 Mixed by Bill Kennedy
 Pro Tools by Chris Vrenna
 Mastered by Tom Baker
The Final Kill 2018 remix and remaster
 Mixed by Mark Lewis
 Mastered by Ted Jensen

References 

1985 songs
Megadeth songs
Songs written by Dave Mustaine